Chang Yongxiang (born September 16, 1983 in Handan County, Handan, Hebei) is a male Chinese Greco-Roman wrestler who competed at the 2008 Summer Olympics, where he won the silver medal.

His personal best was coming 1st at the 2008 Asian Championships.

References
 Profile at 2008teamchina.olympic.cn

External links
 
 

1983 births
Living people
Olympic silver medalists for China
Olympic wrestlers of China
Chinese male sport wrestlers
Sportspeople from Handan
Wrestlers at the 2008 Summer Olympics
Olympic medalists in wrestling
Wrestlers at the 2010 Asian Games
Medalists at the 2008 Summer Olympics
Asian Games competitors for China
21st-century Chinese people